The 2014 Costa Rican Cup (known as Copa Popular for sponsorship reasons) is the 2nd staging of the Costa Rican Cup. The competition began on July 12 and finished on August 10 with the final at the Estadio Nacional.

The Cup featured 16 teams, including 12 from the FPD (including the newly promoted team AS Puma Generaleña), and 4 from the Liga de Ascenso (not including the recently relegated team, Puntarenas).

The tournament marked several differences compared to its predecessor. A Group Stage was added, with the first placed teams of each group qualifying to the Semi-Finals.

The tournament saw Cartaginés defeating defending champions Saprissa in the final to achieve their first Costa Rican Cup.

Qualified teams
The following teams competed in the 2014 Copa Popular.

12 teams from the 2014–15 FPD:

Alajuelense
AS Puma Generaleña
Belén
Carmelita
Cartaginés
Herediano
Limón
Pérez Zeledón
Santos de Guápiles
Saprissa
Universidad de Costa Rica
Uruguay de Coronado

4 teams from the 2014 15 Liga de Ascenso:

Cariari
Guanacasteca
Jacó Rays
San Carlos

Group stage

Group A

Group B

Group C

Group D

Knockout stage

References

External links
 

Costa Rican Cup
Cup